Rajmond is an Albanian and Hungarian masculine given name. It is a cognate of the French and English name Raymond. People bearing the name Rajmond include:

Rajmond Breznik, Hungarian footballer
Rajmond Debevec (born 1963), Slovenian sports shooter
Rajmond Hoxha (born 19??), Albanian politician
Rajmond Toricska (born 1993), Hungarian footballer

References

Albanian masculine given names
Hungarian masculine given names